Tendring District Council in Essex, England is elected every four years. Since the last boundary changes in 2003, 60 councillors have been elected from 32 wards.

Political control
Since the foundation of the council in 1973 political control of the council has been held by the following parties:

Leadership
The leaders of the council since 2009 have been:

Council elections
1973 Tendring District Council election
1976 Tendring District Council election (New ward boundaries)
1979 Tendring District Council election
1983 Tendring District Council election
1987 Tendring District Council election

By-election results

1995-1999

1999-2003

2003-2007

2007-2011

2015-present

References

 By-election results

External links
 Tendring District Council

 
Council elections in Essex
District council elections in England